RNA-binding protein 33 is a protein that in humans is encoded by the RBM33 gene.

References

Further reading